This article provides details of international football games played by the Kyrgyzstan women's national football team from 2000–present.

Result

2009

2013

2015

2017

2018

2019

2022

See also
 Kyrgyzstan national football team results

References

External links
 Kyrgyzstan results on The Roon Ba

Results women
2010s in Kyrgyzstan
2020s in Kyrgyzstan
Women's national association football team results
Kyrgyzstan women's national football team